The Society of Arts and Crafts is one of America's oldest arts and craft nonprofit organization. The Society moved to Boston's Seaport District in 2016 after being located on Newbury Street for over 40 years. The Society was incorporated by twenty-one individuals on June 28, 1897, and was then known as the Society of Arts and Crafts in Boston. The small group was representational of Boston's elites in the fields of teaching, art-making, architecture, and craft. The original Society began with the agreement to "develop and encourage higher artistic standards in the handcrafts."

Frederic Allen Whiting was the Director at the Society until 1912, when Humphery J. Emery took over. He would serve on the board of directors until the 1930s.

Mission 
The Society's mission is to support and celebrate craft makers and their creativity. Through its various programs, the organization strives to inspire the creation, assemblage, and promotion of the work of contemporary craft makers. The advancement of public appreciation of fine art has been a lifelong goal of the Society. The Society of Arts + Crafts sponsors exhibitions, the Artist Awards Programs, the John D. Mineck Furniture Fellowship, and educational programming in order to promote the work of contemporary craft artists. Prior to moving fully online in 2020, its retail and exhibition galleries featured nearly four hundred craft artists.

Exhibitions 
The following is a list of SA+C's exhibitions since 2012.

Annual events 
Every year, the Society of Arts + Crafts hosts two promotional events for local and international artists, CraftBoston Spring and CraftBoston Holiday. CraftBoston is a show of contemporary art, craft and design, and is well known for its advancement of both the arts and craftspeople.  These events are held at popular venues and convention halls in Boston biannually.

Publications 

 Exhibition of the Society of arts & crafts, 1907

External links 
 The Society of Arts and Crafts
 Instagram, Facebook,Twitter

References

Organizations based in Boston
Non-profit organizations based in Boston